Daily Operation is the third studio album by American hip hop duo Gang Starr. It was released by Chrysalis Records on May 5, 1992. It peaked at number 65 on the Billboard 200 chart.

Critical reception

Stanton Swihart of AllMusic wrote: "From beginning to end, Gang Starr's third full-length album cuts with the force and precision of a machete and serves as an ode to and representation of New York and hip-hop underground culture." He added: "Every song has some attribute that stamps it indelibly into the listener's head, and it marks the album as one of the finest of the decade, rap or otherwise."

In 2017, Complex placed it at number 41 on the "Best Rap Albums of the '90s" list.

Track listing

Personnel
Credits adapted from liner notes.

 DJ Premier – producer, beats, scratches, mixing
 "The Guru" – vocals, producer, mixing
 Lil Dap – vocals (6)
 Jeru the Damaja – vocals (6)
 Eddie Sancho – engineering
 Lisle Leete – recording (13), engineering
 Yorum Vazan – mixing (13)
 Eddie Snacho – engineering
 Howie Weinberg – mastering
 Marc Cozza – art direction, design
 Matt Gunther – photography
 April Walker – fashion styling

Charts

Weekly charts

Year-end charts

References

External links
 

1992 albums
Gang Starr albums
Albums produced by DJ Premier
Albums produced by Guru
Chrysalis Records albums